Chichester City Ladies and Girls Football Club, usually abbreviated to just Chichester City Ladies or Chichester City L.F.C., is a women's football club based in Chichester, West Sussex, England. Affiliated with Chichester City F.C., they are currently members of the FA Women's National League South and play at Oaklands Park.

History
The men's club was established in 2000 as a merger of Chichester City and Portfield, and was originally named Chichester City United. In 2015 the club was renamed Chichester City. In 2012 a ladies side was formed.

Ground
The club is one of the few clubs to share the stadium with their male counterparts, Oaklands Park. In 2008 after a 100-seat stand was installed and a new clubhouse and changing rooms were completed in 2010, with hard-standing installed on all four sides of the pitch.

Feeder teams
The club operates a Development Squad side that plays as of 2018-19 season plays in the FAWNL Reserves League and several youth teams under the structures of Chichester City Ladies Youth.

See also
Chichester City F.C.

References

External links

Football clubs in England
Football clubs in West Sussex
Sport in Chichester
Association football clubs established in 2012
2012 establishments in England